The 2014 ACB Playoffs were the final phase of the 2013–14 ACB season. They started on May 29 and ended on June 19. Real Madrid were the defending champions.

All times are CEST (UTC+02:00), except the game played in the Canary Islands (WEST, UTC+01:00)

Bracket

Quarterfinals
The quarterfinals are best-of-3 series.

Real Madrid vs. CAI Zaragoza

Unicaja vs. Herbalife Gran Canaria

Valencia Basket vs. Cajasol

FC Barcelona vs. Laboral Kutxa

Semifinals

Real Madrid vs. Unicaja

Valencia Basket vs. FC Barcelona

Final

Real Madrid vs. FC Barcelona

References

Liga ACB playoffs
Playoffs